Francis Mortiford Kelliher (May 23, 1899 – March 4, 1956) was an American Major League Baseball player who pinch hit on one game for the Washington Senators on September 19, . He went 0–1 in his only career at bat.

External links

1899 births
1956 deaths
Washington Senators (1901–1960) players
Baseball players from Massachusetts
Bridgeport Americans players
Pittsfield Hillies players